Pauli Ensio Siitonen (born 3 February 1938) is a retired Finnish cross-country skier. He was one of the most successful long-distance cross-country skiers of the 1970s, and in 1973 became the second Finnish skier to win Vasaloppet. Siitonen competed at the 1968 Olympics, and won the Finlandia-hiihto in Finland and König-Ludwig-Lauf in West Germany.

Siitonen is credited with popularizing the so-called Siitonen-step (or "marathon skate"), the precursor to modern skating technique in cross-country skiing.

Cross-country skiing results

Olympic Games

References 

1938 births
Finnish male cross-country skiers
Living people
Vasaloppet winners
Cross-country skiers at the 1968 Winter Olympics
Olympic cross-country skiers of Finland
20th-century Finnish people